Following are the results of the 2003 Copa Aerosur, the Bolivian football tournament held in La Paz, Cochabamba and Santa Cruz, sponsored by AeroSur airline.

The 2003 Edition started in January and ended in February. The final was Buenos Aires, Argentina.

First round

|}

Second round

|}

Third round

|}

Bracket

Quarter finals

|}

Semi-final

|}

Final

2003
2003 domestic association football cups
2003 in Bolivian football